John S. Dauwalter House is a historic home located at Boonville, Cooper County, Missouri. It was built about 1869, and is a -story, vernacular brick dwelling. A front gable ell was added about 1880, and a rear shed addition and enclosure of a recessed corner porch completed about 1920.  Also on the property are the contributing gable roofed cow barn, a shed roofed storage building, and a two-room wash house with a saltbox roof.

It was listed on the National Register of Historic Places in 1990.

References

Houses on the National Register of Historic Places in Missouri
Houses completed in 1869
Houses in Cooper County, Missouri
National Register of Historic Places in Cooper County, Missouri
1869 establishments in Missouri
Boonville, Missouri